Mid East Jet Saudi Arabia Limited, doing business as Mid East Jet, is a charter airline based in Jeddah, Saudi Arabia. It is a privately owned premium class airline operating domestic and international scheduled and charter services. Its main base is King Abdulaziz International Airport, Jeddah, with several other sister companies. As of 2013 it was one of seven Saudi-based airline companies.

Fleet 

The Mid East Jet fleet consists of the following aircraft (as of June 2017):

The airline fleet previously included the following aircraft (as of 28 June 2010):
 1 Airbus A319-100 (operated by Masterjet)
 1 McDonnell Douglas MD-11

References

External links 
 Mid East Jet website

Airlines of Saudi Arabia
Airlines established in 1990
Saudi Arabian companies established in 1990
1990 establishments in Saudi Arabia